The Farming and Irrigation Artifacts Museum is a museum in Linnei Township, Yunlin County, Taiwan.

Exhibitions
The museum exhibits traditional irrigation techniques and their history.

Transportation
The museum is accessible within walking distance north of Linnei Station of Taiwan Railways.

See also
 List of museums in Taiwan

References

Museums established in 2016
2016 establishments in Taiwan
Museums in Yunlin County